Tylenchorhynchus vulgaris is a plant pathogenic nematode infecting pearl millet.

External links 
 Nemaplex, University of California - Tylenchorhynchus vulgaris

Agricultural pest nematodes
Pearl millet diseases
Tylenchida